A crown is a traditional form of head adornment, or hat, worn by monarchs as a symbol of their power and dignity. A crown is often, by extension, a symbol of the monarch's government or items endorsed by it. The word itself is used, particularly in Commonwealth countries, as an abstract name for the monarchy itself, as distinct from the individual who inhabits it (that is, The Crown). A specific type of crown (or coronet for lower ranks of peerage) is employed in heraldry under strict rules. Indeed, some monarchies never had a physical crown, just a heraldic representation, as in the constitutional kingdom of Belgium, where no coronation ever took place; the royal installation is done by a solemn oath in parliament, wearing a military uniform: the King is not acknowledged as by divine right, but assumes the only hereditary public office in the service of the law; so he in turn will swear in all members of "his" federal government.

Variations
 Costume headgear imitating a monarch's crown is also called a crown hat. Such costume crowns may be worn by actors portraying a monarch, people at costume parties, or ritual "monarchs" such as the king of a Carnival krewe, or the person who found the trinket in a king cake.
 The nuptial crown, sometimes called a coronal, worn by a bride, and sometimes the bridegroom, at her wedding is found in many European cultures since ancient times. In the present day, it is most common in Eastern Orthodox cultures. The Eastern Orthodox marriage service has a section called the crowning, wherein the bride and groom are crowned as "king" and "queen" of their future household.  In Greek weddings, the crowns are diadems usually made of white flowers, synthetic or real, often adorned with silver or mother of pearl.  They are placed on the heads of the newlyweds and are held together by a ribbon of white silk.  They are then kept by the couple as a reminder of their special day. In Slavic weddings, the crowns are usually made of ornate metal, designed to resemble an imperial crown, and are held above the newlyweds' heads by their best men.  A parish usually owns one set to use for all the couples that are married there since these are much more expensive than Greek-style crowns. This was common in Catholic countries in the past.
 Crowns are also often used as symbols of religious status or veneration, by divinities (or their representation such as a statue) or by their representatives (e.g., the Black Crown of the Karmapa Lama) sometimes used a model for wider use by devotees. 
 According to the New Testament, a crown of thorns was placed on the head of Jesus before his crucifixion; it has become a common symbol of martyrdom. 
 According to Roman Catholic tradition, the Blessed Virgin Mary was crowned as Queen of Heaven after her assumption into heaven. She is often depicted wearing a crown, and statues of her in churches and shrines are ceremonially crowned during May.
 The Crown of Immortality is also common in historical symbolism.
 The heraldic symbol of Three Crowns, referring to the three evangelical Magi (wise men), traditionally called kings, is believed thus to have become the symbol of the Swedish kingdom, but it also fits the historical (personal, dynastic) Kalmar Union (1397–1520) between the three kingdoms of Denmark, Sweden, and Norway.
 In India, crowns are known as makuta (Sanskrit for "crest"), and have been used in India since ancient times and are described adorning Hindu gods or kings. The makuta style was then copied by the Indianized kingdoms that was influenced by Hindu-Buddhist concept of kingship in Southeast Asia, such as in Java and Bali in Indonesia, Cambodia, Burma and Thailand.
 Dancers of certain traditional Thai dances often wear crowns (mongkut) on their head. These are inspired in the crowns worn by deities and by kings.
 In pre-Colonial Philippines crown-like diadems, or putong, were worn by elite individuals and deities, among an array of golden ornaments.
 The shamsa was a massive, jewel-inlaid ceremonial crown hung by a chain that was part of the regalia of the Abbasid and Fatimid Caliphates.

Terminology
Three distinct categories of crowns exist in those monarchies that use crowns or state regalia.

 Coronation Worn by monarchs when being crowned.
 State Worn by monarchs on other state occasions.
 Consort crowns Worn by a consort, signifying rank granted as a constitutional courtesy protocol.

Crowns or similar headgear, as worn by nobility and other high-ranking people below the ruler, is in English often called a coronet; however, in many languages, this distinction is not made and the same word is used for both types of headgear (e.g., French couronne, German Krone, Dutch kroon). In some of these languages the term "rank crown" (rangkroon, etc.) refers to the way these crowns may be ranked according to hierarchical status.
In classical antiquity, the crown (corona) that was sometimes awarded to people other than rulers, such as triumphal military generals or athletes, was actually a wreath or chaplet, or ribbon-like diadem.

History

Crowns have been discovered in pre-historic times from Haryana, India. The precursor to the crown was the browband called the diadem, which had been worn by the Achaemenid Persian emperors. It was adopted by Constantine I and was worn by all subsequent rulers of the later Roman Empire.
Almost all Sassanid kings wore crowns. One of the most famous kings who left numerous statues, reliefs and coins of crowns is the king Shapur I.

Numerous crowns of various forms were used in antiquity, such as the Hedjet, Deshret, Pschent (double crown) and Khepresh of Pharaonic Egypt. The Pharaohs of Egypt also wore the diadem, which was associated with solar cults, an association which was not completely lost, as it was later revived under the Roman Emperor Augustus. By the time of the Pharaoh Amenophis III (r.1390–1352c)  wearing a diadem clearly became a symbol of royalty. The wreaths and crowns of classical antiquity were sometimes made from natural materials such as laurel, myrtle, olive, or wild celery.

The corona radiata, the "radiant crown" known best on the Statue of Liberty, and perhaps worn by the Helios that was the Colossus of Rhodes, was worn by Roman emperors as part of the cult of Sol Invictus prior to the Roman Empire's conversion to Christianity. It was referred to as "the chaplet studded with sunbeams” by Lucian, about 180 AD.

Perhaps the oldest extant Christian crown in Europe is the Iron Crown of Lombardy, of Roman and Longobard antiquity, used by the Holy Roman Empire and the Kingdom of Italy. Later again used to crown modern Kings of Napoleonic and Austrian Italy, and to represent united Italy after 1860. Today, the crown is kept in the Cathedral of Monza.
In the Christian tradition of European cultures, where ecclesiastical sanction authenticates monarchic power when a new monarch ascends the throne, the crown is placed on the new monarch's head by a religious official in a coronation ceremony. Some, though not all, early Holy Roman Emperors travelled to Rome at some point in their careers to be crowned by the pope. Napoleon, according to legend, surprised Pius VII when he reached out and crowned himself, although in reality this order of ceremony had been pre-arranged.

Today, only the British Monarchy and Tongan Monarchy, with their anointed and crowned monarchs, continue this tradition, although many monarchies retain a crown as a national symbol. The French Crown Jewels were sold in 1885 on the orders of the Third French Republic, with only a token number, their precious stones replaced by glass, retained for historic reasons and displayed in the Louvre. The Spanish Crown Jewels were destroyed in a major fire in the 18th century while the so-called "Irish Crown Jewels" (actually merely the British Sovereign's insignia of the Most Illustrious Order of St Patrick) were stolen from Dublin Castle in 1907, just before the investiture of Bernard Edward Barnaby FitzPatrick, 2nd Baron Castletown.

The Crown of King George XII of Georgia made of gold and decorated with 145 diamonds, 58 rubies, 24 emeralds, and 16 amethysts. It took the form of a circlet surmounted by ornaments and eight arches. A globe surmounted by a cross rested on the top of the crown.

Special headgear to designate rulers dates back to pre-history, and is found in many separate civilizations around the globe. Commonly, rare and precious materials are incorporated into the crown, but that is only essential for the notion of crown jewels. Gold and precious jewels are common in western and oriental crowns. In the Native American civilizations of the Pre-Columbian New World, rare feathers, such as that of the quetzal, often decorated crowns; so too in Polynesia (e.g., Hawaii).

Coronation ceremonies are often combined with other rituals, such as enthronement (the throne is as much a symbol of monarchy as the crown) and anointing (again, a religious sanction, the only defining act in the Biblical tradition of Israel).

In other cultures, no crown is used in the equivalent of coronation, but the head may still be otherwise symbolically adorned; for example, with a royal tikka in the Hindu tradition of India.

Image gallery

Numismatics
Because one or more crowns, alone or as part of a more elaborate design, often appear on coins, several monetary denominations came to be known as 'a crown' or the equivalent word in the local language, such as krone''. This persists in the case of the national currencies of the Scandinavian countries and the Czech Republic.  The generic term "crown sized" is frequently used for any coin roughly the size of an American silver dollar.

See also

References

External links

 
Formal insignia
Headgear
Types of jewellery
Monarchy
State ritual and ceremonies